Margherita Bontade (5 October 19004 June 1992) was an Italian politician.

Bontade was born in Palermo.  She represented the Christian Democracy in the Chamber of Deputies from 1948 to 1968.

References

1900 births
1992 deaths
Politicians from Palermo
Christian Democracy (Italy) politicians
Deputies of Legislature I of Italy
Deputies of Legislature II of Italy
Deputies of Legislature III of Italy
Deputies of Legislature IV of Italy